257 (two hundred [and] fifty-seven) is the natural number following 256 and preceding 258.

257 is a prime number of the form  specifically with n = 3, and therefore a Fermat prime. Thus a regular polygon with 257 sides is constructible with compass and unmarked straightedge.  It is currently the second largest known Fermat prime. 

Analogously, 257 is the third Sierpinski prime of the first kind, of the form  ➜ .

It is also
a balanced prime,
an irregular prime,
a prime that is one more than a square,
and a Jacobsthal–Lucas number.

There are exactly 257 combinatorially distinct convex polyhedra with eight vertices (or polyhedral graphs with eight nodes).

References

Integers